Diamond Hoo Ha is the sixth and final studio album by British alternative rock band Supergrass, released in the UK on 24 March 2008, and offers a return to punchier Supergrass songs, in comparison to the more mellow Road to Rouen, their previous album released in 2005. Several songs appearing on the album were performed at Guilfest 2007. In November 2007, the track "Diamond Hoo Ha Man"—one of the songs debuted at Guilfest—was distributed as the first single on a limited vinyl release, restricted to 1500 copies. "Bad Blood" followed as the second single on 17 March 2008, peaking in the top 75 at number 73.

The third single, "Rebel in You" with B-side "Car Crash", was limited to 1500 copies on 7" white vinyl only and released on 30 June 2008 via Supergrass Records (the release date and distribution, however, were delayed past 30 June due to a problem at the record pressing plant). The single is only available for mail order purchase from the Supergrass Records website, with the first 200 copies ordered being signed by the band themselves. The single was planned to be distributed by Parlophone, but EMI refused to fund its release, along with any costs for the creation of an accompanying video. The singles' covers all follow the trend of having a gorilla's hand on them.

Recording and production 
Diamond Hoo Ha was recorded at Hansa Tonstudio in Berlin where David Bowie, amongst others, had also previously recorded albums. "The whole place hasn't changed much since the Seventies – the furniture hadn't been cleaned, loads of the stuff didn't work. The mixing desk was quite fucked, so it took three or four days to get the first backing track done. But the atmosphere was great. It was a bit of a shaky start but we were flying after that," recounted Danny Goffey.

The group apparently spent six months writing lyrics for the album, splitting into pairs for inspiration.

Nick Launay, who had worked with names such as PiL, Kate Bush, Gang of Four, Midnight Oil and Nick Cave was nominated as producer for the record; "He [Launay] knew Danny was like an animal on the kit, about Rob's experimentation on the keyboards, what Mick could do on the bass. Nick just understood us. He's loved our band for a long time, seen us live, recognized the energy. At the start he said, I know what you can do, and I've seen you do it, but I'd love to make a record where you all go for it," said Gaz Coombes. The track "Bad Blood" is featured in the video game Need for Speed Undercover.

Packaging 
The front cover displays the band in a group photo with their instruments; (the photography for this is credited to Kevin Westenberg) the guitar Gaz Coombes is pictured with is a Fender Telecaster Deluxe and the overall album artwork design was compiled by Traffic.

Reception 

The album peaked at number 19 in the UK charts, making it their lowest charting album. The three singles from Diamond Hoo Ha received a fair amount of airplay on rock radio stations with all three entering the Xfm playlist. However, because the three singles did not enter the top 40 they did not receive very regular airplay on the more mainstream radio stations. The NME said that the album was "definitely worth making a Hoo Ha over", and Uncut claimed that it was "Twenty four carat stuff guaranteed."

Singles 
 "Diamond Hoo Ha Man" – vinyl limited to 1500 copies
 "Bad Blood" – No. 73 UK
 "Rebel in You" – vinyl limited to 1500 copies

Track listing 
All tracks written and composed by Supergrass (Coombes/Coombes/Goffey/Quinn).

 "Diamond Hoo Ha Man" – 3:25
 "Bad Blood" – 3:03
 "Rebel in You" – 4:41
 "When I Needed You" – 2:31
 "345" – 3:39
 "The Return Of..." – 3:35
 "Rough Knuckles" – 3:24
 "Ghost of a Friend" – 3:54
 "Whiskey & Green Tea" – 4:16
 "Outside" – 3:32
 "Butterfly" – 5:10

Personnel

Band 
 Gaz Coombes – lead vocals, backing vocals, guitar
 Mick Quinn – bass, backing vocals
 Rob Coombes – keyboards, backing vocals
 Danny Goffey – drums and percussion, lead vocals on 8

Additional personnel 
 Pete Wareham – saxophone on track 6 and track 9
 Jodie Rose – additional vocals on track 8

Production 
 Nick Launay – producer, mixing
 Steven Marcussen – mastering
 Stuart Whitmore – editing
 Rich Costey – mixing on track 3
 Ian Davenport – additional recording
 Sam Williams – additional arrangements on tracks 2, 3, 5, 10 and 11
 Traffic – artwork (sleeve)
 Kevin Westenberg – photography
 Greg Allum – photography

Charts

References

External links

Diamond Hoo Ha at YouTube (streamed copy where licensed)
 Official site
 Supergrass Records

Supergrass albums
2008 albums
Albums produced by Nick Launay
Parlophone albums
Astralwerks albums